Scharfenstein Castle may refer to:

 Scharfenstein Castle (Kiedrich),
 Scharfenstein Castle (Ore Mountains)